Claude Kévers-Pascalis (1920 – 3 February 2016) was a Belgian writer, historian and engineer.

Career as engineer 
A graduate from the École centrale Paris and the Institut français de contrôle de gestion, he worked as a consulting engineer in Paris before he joined Nancy where he spent the rest of his career. He worked as responsible for security checks, in particular of nuclear power plant boilers.

Distinctions 

Works 
1986: 
1989: 
1992: 
1995: 
2002: 
 
2005 
2010:

Participation to collective works 
2006:

References

External links 
 Obituary on L'Est Républicain (5 February 2016)
 Claude Kévers-Pascalis in the annuary of the Académie Lorraine des sciences
 La création, au siècle des Lumières de la première en date des Grandes Ecoles Françaises d’Ingénieurs : l’Ecole Nationale des Ponts et Chaussée
 

École Centrale Paris alumni
20th-century Belgian engineers
20th-century Belgian writers
21st-century Belgian writers
Officers of the Ordre national du Mérite
1920 births
2016 deaths
Belgian expatriates in France